Janet Ethne Anne Henfrey (born 16 August 1935) is a British stage and television actress. She is best known for playing Mrs. Bale on As Time Goes By, and for her role as the schoolteacher in the Dennis Potter television play Stand Up, Nigel Barton (1965), and Potter's serial The Singing Detective (1986), also as a schoolteacher.

Early life
Before training at the Royal Academy of Dramatic Art she read English at St Anne's College, Oxford, and spent a graduate year at Smith College reading History.

Credits
Other TV credits include: Victoria Wood: As Seen on TV (1985); As Time Goes By, The Jewel in the Crown;  Reilly, Ace of Spies; Doctor Who (in the serial The Curse of Fenric and the episode "Mummy on the Orient Express"); Jeeves and Wooster; Casualty; Lovejoy; One Foot in the Grave; My Uncle Silas and Simon and the Witch. Henfrey also played a minor character in an episode of the 1996 series of The Famous Five, "Five Get into Trouble" and Mistress Hecate Broomhead in two episodes of The Worst Witch ("The Inspector Calls" and "Just Like Clockwork"). She appeared in the 2002 adaption of the British miniseries Tipping The Velvet playing the character Mrs Jex, based on the novel by Sarah Waters. She also appeared in the 2015 British miniseries adaptation of Wolf Hall.

Personal life
Janet Henfrey lives in Islington, north London. She is a member of the Labour Party and a trustee of the International Performers Aid Trust.

Filmography

Television

References

External links
 

1935 births
Living people
20th-century English actresses
21st-century English actresses
Actresses from Hampshire
Alumni of RADA
Alumni of St Anne's College, Oxford
English stage actresses
English television actresses
Actors from Aldershot
Smith College alumni